This is a list of broadcast television stations licensed to cities in the U.S. state of Colorado.

Full-power stations
VC refers to the station's PSIP virtual channel. RF refers to the station's physical RF channel.

Defunct full-power stations
Channel 3: KDZA-TV – DuMont – Pueblo (March 16, 1953 – April 21, 1954)
Channel 6: KJFL-TV – Ind. – Durango (November 4, 1963 – March 2, 1964)

LPTV stations

Translators

See also
 List of Spanish-language television networks in the United States

Colorado

Television stations